Haysville can refer to:

Haysville, Indiana, United States
Haysville, Kansas, United States
Haysville, Pennsylvania, United States
Haysville, Ontario, Canada

See also
Haseville, Missouri